The ovenbird (Seiurus aurocapilla) is a small songbird of the New World warbler family (Parulidae). This migratory bird breeds in eastern North America and winters in Central America, many Caribbean islands, Florida and northern Venezuela.

Taxonomy
The genus Seiurus is currently treated as monotypic, containing only the ovenbird; it is genetically distinct from all other species in the family Parulidae, probably the first genus to evolve separately from the rest of the family.

Before the recent genetic studies were carried out, the waterthrushes were also included in Seiurus; these are now treated separately in the genus Parkesia as they are not very closely related to the ovenbird.

The species name aurocapilla is a noun phrase, so the original spelling is retained, not changed according to the gender of the genus name; Linnaeus originally named it Motacilla aurocapilla, and the ending is not changed to -us as commonly cited in the past.  Etymologically aurocapilla comes from Latin and means "golden haired" and Seiurus is from Ancient Greek seiō, "to shake", and oura, "tail".

Description 

Ovenbirds are large wood warblers and may sometimes be confused by the untrained for a thrush. They tend to be heavier in winter and particularly at the start of their migration. They have olive-brown upperparts and white underparts heavily streaked with black; the flanks have an olive hue. A white ring surrounds the eyes, and a black stripe runs below the cheek. They have a line of orange feathers with olive-green tips running along the top of their head, bordered on each side with blackish-brown. The orange feathers can be erected to form a small crest. The eyes and the upper part of the thin pointed beak are dark, while the lower beak is horn-colored and the legs and feet are pinkish.

Males and females look alike. Immature birds have tawny fringes to the tertiary remiges and sometimes buff-tipped outer primary wing coverts. Most conspicuously, the olive-green tips of the crown feathers, which are hardly visible in adult birds, are far larger in extent in immatures and cover the orange crown-stripe almost or completely.

The main song of the ovenbird is a series of strident, relatively low-pitched, bisyallabic motives repeated without pause about eight times and increasing in volume. Usually, the second syllable in each motive is sharply accented: "chur-tee’ chur-tee’ chur-tee’ chur-tee’ chur-TEE chur-TEE chur-TEE!" Male ovenbirds utter a sweet chattering song in the air at twilight, after the manner of the skylark, incorporating portions of the main song into a jumble of sputtering notes and mimicry as they dive back to earth. The call is a variably pitched, sharp "chik!" Some variations recall the common call note of a downy woodpecker. If the bird is excited, it may repeat this call several times. The fight call is a high, rising siiii.

Range and ecology 
Their breeding habitats are mature deciduous and mixed forests, especially sites with little undergrowth, across Canada and the eastern United States. For foraging, it prefers woodland with abundant undergrowth of shrubs; essentially, it thrives best in a mix of primary and secondary forest. Ovenbirds migrate to the southeastern United States, the Caribbean, and from Mexico to northern South America. The birds are territorial all year round, occurring either singly or (in the breeding season) as mated pairs, for a short time accompanied by their young. During migration, they tend to travel in larger groups however, dispersing again once they reach their destination.

In winter, they dwell mainly in lowlands, but may ascend up to  ASL e.g. in Costa Rica. The first migrants leave in late August and appear on the wintering grounds as early as September, with successive waves arriving until late October or so. They depart again to breed between late March and early May, arriving on the breeding grounds throughout April and May. Migration times do not seem to have changed much over the course of the 20th century.

This bird seems just capable of crossing the Atlantic, as there have been a handful of records in Norway, Ireland and Great Britain. However, half of the six finds were of dead birds. A live ovenbird on St Mary's, Isles of Scilly in October 2004 was in bad condition, and died despite being taken into care.

Ovenbirds forage on the ground in dead leaves, sometimes hovering or catching insects in flight. This bird frequently tilts its tail up and bobs its head while walking; at rest, the tail may be flicked up and slowly lowered again, and alarmed birds flick the tail frequently from a half-raised position. These birds mainly eat terrestrial arthropods and snails, and also include fruit in their diet during winter.

The nest, referred to as the "oven" (which gives the bird its name), is a domed structure placed on the ground, woven from vegetation, and containing a side entrance. The female usually lays 4-5 eggs speckled with brown or gray. Only the female incubates, for 11-14 days. Young are altricial and are fed by both parents. First flight is at 8-11 days of age.

The placement of the nest on the ground makes predation by snakes, red squirrels, and chipmunks (Tamias) a greater concern than for tree-nesting birds. Chipmunks have been known to burrow directly into the nest to eat the young birds. The female can perform a distraction display, simulating a crippled bird, when a potential predator is in the vicinity of the nest.

The ovenbird is vulnerable to nest parasitism by the brown-headed cowbird (Molothrus ater), which is becoming more plentiful in some areas. However, the ovenbirds' numbers appear to be remaining stable. Altogether, it is not considered a threatened species by the IUCN.

In literature
It is the subject of a poem by Robert Frost, "The Oven Bird", published in his poetry collection Mountain Interval in 1916. Robert Bly also makes reference to "the nimble oven bird" in his short poem "The Slim Fir Seeds".

References 

 Ovenbird Species Account – Cornell Lab of Ornithology
 Ovenbird – Seiurus aurocapillus – USGS Patuxent Bird Identification InfoCenter
 
 
Ovenbird info  If you would like more facts about the Ovenbird click here

Seiurus
New World warblers
Native birds of Eastern Canada
Native birds of the Eastern United States
Birds of the Dominican Republic
Birds described in 1766
Articles containing video clips
Taxa named by Carl Linnaeus